Ruszków may refer to the following places:
Ruszków, Łódź Voivodeship (central Poland)
Ruszków, Masovian Voivodeship (east-central Poland)
Ruszków, Świętokrzyskie Voivodeship (south-central Poland)